Trillium texanum, the Texas trillium or Texas wakerobin, is a species of flowering plant in the family Melanthiaceae. It is found in east Texas, extreme southwestern Arkansas and extreme northwestern Louisiana, typically in forested wetland habitat. Due to its limited range, it is designated as an imperiled species. In Louisiana, it is critically imperiled.

Trillium texanum is a member of T. subg. Trillium, the pedicellate-flowered trilliums. It is a perennial herbaceous plant that flowers from March to early mid-April, with white flower petals.

Trillium texanum was first described by Samuel Botsford Buckley in 1861. It is sometimes regarded as a variety of Trillium pusillum, either T. pusillum var. texanum or T. pusillum var. pusillum.

References

External links
 

texanum
Endemic flora of the United States
Flora of the Eastern United States